1684 Iguassú, provisional designation , is a carbonaceous asteroid from the outer region of the asteroid belt, approximately 30.5 kilometers in diameter. It was discovered on 23 August 1951, by Argentine astronomer Miguel Itzigsohn at the La Plata Astronomical Observatory, located in the city of La Plata, Argentina. It was named after the Iguazu Falls in South America.

Orbit and classification 

The asteroid orbits the Sun in the outer main-belt at a distance of 2.7–3.5 AU once every 5 years and 5 months (1,992 days). Its orbit has an eccentricity of 0.13 and an inclination of 4° with respect to the ecliptic.

Physical characteristics 

Iguassú is characterized as a carbonaceous C-type asteroid.

Rotation period 

In January 2014, two rotational lightcurves of Iguassú were obtained at the Palomar Transient Factory in California.

Diameter and albedo 

According to the survey carried out by NASA's Wide-field Infrared Survey Explorer with its subsequent NEOWISE mission, Iguassú measures between 30.21 and 31.38 kilometers in diameter, and its surface has an albedo between 0.08 and 0.093. The Collaborative Asteroid Lightcurve Link assumes a standard albedo for carbonaceous asteroids of 0.057 and calculates a diameter of 30.62 kilometers based on an absolute magnitude of 11.3.

Naming 

This minor planet is named for the large Iguazu Falls, a 60 meters high and 1 kilometer wide waterfall, which river of the same name marks part of the boundary between Argentina and Brazil. As a curiosity, the spelling of the minor planet's name (Iguassú) neither concurs with the Spanish "Iguazú" nor with the Portuguese "Iguaçu". It is rather similar to "Yguasu", used in the native Guarani language, from which the waterfall's name originates. The official naming citation was published by the Minor Planet Center on 8 April 1982.

References

External links 
 Asteroid Lightcurve Database (LCDB), query form (info )
 Dictionary of Minor Planet Names, Google books
 Asteroids and comets rotation curves, CdR – Observatoire de Genève, Raoul Behrend
 Discovery Circumstances: Numbered Minor Planets (1)-(5000) – Minor Planet Center
 
 

001684
Discoveries by Miguel Itzigsohn
Named minor planets
19510823